Raynault is a French surname. Notable people with the surname include:

 Adhémar Raynault (1891–1984), Canadian politician
 Francine Raynault (born 1945), Canadian politician
 Ginette Raynault (born 1946), Canadian author, composer, singer, and actress

French-language surnames